Richard Hamilton Taylor (September 8, 1870 – March 24, 1956) was a quartermaster serving in the United States Navy who received the Medal of Honor for bravery.

Taylor was born in Staunton, Virginia, and later joined the navy. For his actions received the Medal of Honor March 20, 1905.

He is buried in Evergreen Cemetery in Brighton, Massachusetts. His grave can be found in the Pine Grove section, grave 821.

Medal of Honor citation
Rank and organization: Quartermaster, U.S. Navy. Born: 1871, Virginia. Accredited to: Virginia. G.O. No.: 157, 20 April 1904.

Citation:

Serving on board the U.S.S. Nipsic, Taylor displayed gallantry during the hurricane at Apia, Samoa, 16 March 1889.

See also

List of Medal of Honor recipients during peacetime

References

External links

1870 births
1956 deaths
United States Navy Medal of Honor recipients
United States Navy sailors
People from Staunton, Virginia
Burials in Massachusetts
Non-combat recipients of the Medal of Honor